David Wager (March 17, 1804 – July 27, 1870) was an American politician from New York.

Life
He was a member of the New York State Assembly (Oneida Co.) in 1833 and 1835.

He was a member of the New York State Senate (5th D.) from 1836 to 1840, sitting in the 59th, 60th, 61st, 62nd and 63rd New York State Legislatures.

In 1840, he married Mary Eliza Williams (c. 1811–1904), daughter of Judge Nathan Williams (1773–1835). Their daughter Mary Wager married in 1863 State Senator Alexander T. Goodwin (1837–1899).

Wager died on July 27, 1870. David Wager and his wife were buried at the Forest Hill Cemetery, Utica.

Gen. Henry Halleck (1815–1872) and Bishop Henry Benjamin Whipple (1822–1901) were his nephews.

References

Sources
 The New York Civil List compiled by Franklin Benjamin Hough (pp. 131f, 147, 214, 217 and 313; Weed, Parsons and Co., 1858)
 Death notice of his widow, in NYT on January 4, 1904
 Marriage notice in American Masonic Register and Literary Companion (issue of January 11, 1840; p. 151)
 Genealogy of the Whipple-Wright Wager Ward-Pell Mclean-Burnet Families together with records of Allied Families by Chyarles H. Whipple 1917 p. 56

External links
 

1804 births
1870 deaths
Democratic Party New York (state) state senators
Politicians from Utica, New York
Democratic Party members of the New York State Assembly
19th-century American politicians